Manakunnam  is a village in Ernakulam district in the Indian state of Kerala.

Location

Demographics
 India census, Manakunnam had a population of 33523 with 16465 males and 17058 females.

References

Villages in Ernakulam district